The 2011 FIA WTCC Race of Japan was the tenth round of the 2011 World Touring Car Championship season and the fourth running of the FIA WTCC Race of Japan. It was held on 23 October 2011 at the Suzuka Circuit in Suzuka City, Japan.

The first race was won by Alain Menu of Chevrolet RML while Michel Nykjær finished on the podium for the first time in World Touring Car Championship. The second race was won by Tom Coronel of ROAL Motorsport.

Background
Coming into the first Asian round of the season, Yvan Muller was leading the world drivers' championship. Kristian Poulsen was leading the Yokohama Independents' Trophy.

Chevrolet RML added a fourth Chevrolet Cruze for the local rally driver Toshi Arai. Formula D driver Charles Ng joined Liqui Moly Team Engstler in a BMW 320si while Hiroki Yoshimoto joined SUNRED Engineering to drive one of their SUNRED SR León 1.6Ts. Colin Turkington returned to Wiechers-Sport having last raced for them at the Race of UK. Masaki Kano drove for DeTeam KK Motorsport in their BMW 320 TC.

Report

Testing and free practice
Menu led Friday's test session having displaced Polestar Racing's Robert Dahlgren late on. Robert Huff, who had lost his championship lead at the last round was third with Tiago Monteiro separating him from championship leader Muller. Darryl O'Young in the bamboo-engineering Chevrolet was the quickest independent driver when he ended the session ninth. The session had been stopped five minutes in when Norbert Michelisz went off the circuit.

Huff topped the wet first practice session on Saturday morning. Fabio Fabiani and Kano were black flagged for not having their headlights switched on.

The track was drying in free practice two as Menu set the fastest time, he led a Chevrolet 1–2–3 with Muller second and Huff third. Fredy Barth was the top independent driver in fourth.

Qualifying
Qualifying had started with a threat of rain as Menu took pole position in qualifying with championship leading team–mate Muller second. The first session was stopped twice, firstly when Proteam Racing's Mehdi Bennani got stuck in the gravel at the final corner and then again when Pepe Oriola also went off at the final corner and crashed into the wall. O'Young finished the first session tenth and therefore took the reversed grid pole position for race two where he would be joined on the front row by Coronel. Yukinori Taniguchi was 12th at the end of the session and was the quickest local driver.

All the drivers taking part in the second session set their best times in their early runs. At the end of Q2 Menu was ahead of Muller and Dahlgren. Nykjær was the best placed independent driver in seventh.

Fabiani had again failed to get within 107% of the fastest Q1 time but was not allowed to start the races after an altercation with the stewards as well as having incurred a number of other penalties already. Oriola required an engine change and would therefore take a five–place grid drop in race one while Arai failed to report to scrutineering during Q1 so his qualifying times were removed.

Warm-Up
Pole sitter Menu led the warm–up session before the first race, the session came to a close early when Yoshimoto ended up in the gravel.

Race One
Menu started from pole position while Dahlgren behind was tagged by Nykjær which saw the Volvo driver spin and come back across the track at the first corner as the rest of the field passed. Coronel and Tarquini then came together which caught out Tiago Monteiro, Javier Villa, Barth and Yoshimoto; Tarquini and Villa were able to continue. The safety car was brought out while the stranded cars were removed, when the race resumed on lap seven it was Muller leading from Menu and Huff. The following lap Menu was able to make a successful pass for the lead, two laps later Muller then made a mistake and dropped behind Huff and Nykjær. Aleksei Dudukalo had a narrow escape when he spun on the exit of the final corner and came close to hitting the pit wall while team–mate Tarquini had recovered to ninth place after his first lap collision. At the end of the race, Menu led a Chevrolet 1–2 with Huff while Nykjær claimed his first outright podium result in third and the independents' victory with it. Muller was fourth while Taniguchi claimed his best result in the championship by finishing seventh behind Turkington. Bennani in eighth resisted a late charge from Tarquini.

Race Two
Rain had started to fall before the start of the race. O'Young started on pole position but he was passed straight away by Coronel as O'Young was tapped by Tarquini and spun. Dahlgren had got through to fourth at the expense of Menu while Muller and Huff were closing in on Coronel. Tarquini was served with a drive–through penalty on lap five for the collision with O'Young, he went into the pits for his penalty before retiring on lap twelve. Having previously attempted a pass on Huff for third, Dahlgren was re–passed by Menu as his Volvo C30 Drive was plagued by a misfiring engine. Coronel beat Muller to the line by inches, Huff was third and Menu was fourth. Dahlgren ended up fifth while Nykjær in sixth was the Yokohama Trophy victor once again.

Results

Qualifying

Bold denotes Pole position for second race.

 — Arai failed to report to the weighbridge during qualifying and so his times from the session were deleted.

Race 1

Bold denotes Fastest lap.

Race 2

Bold denotes Fastest lap.

Standings after the event

Drivers' Championship standings

Yokohama Independents' Trophy standings

Manufacturers' Championship standings

 Note: Only the top five positions are included for both sets of drivers' standings.

References

External links
World Touring Car Championship official website

Japan
FIA WTCC Race of Japan